Latrophilin 2 is a protein that in humans is encoded by the ADGRL2 gene.

This gene encodes a member of the latrophilin subfamily of G-protein coupled receptors (GPCR). Latrophilins may function in both cell adhesion and signal transduction. In experiments with non-human species, endogenous proteolytic cleavage within a cysteine-rich GPS (G-protein-coupled-receptor proteolysis site) domain resulted in two subunits (a large extracellular N-terminal cell adhesion subunit and a subunit with substantial similarity to the secretin/calcitonin family of GPCRs) being non-covalently bound at the cell membrane. While several transcript variants have been described, the biological validity of only one has been determined.

See also 
 Adhesion G protein-coupled receptors

References

Further reading 

 
 
 
 
 
 
 
 

Latrophilins